All horses are the same color is a falsidical paradox that arises from a flawed use of mathematical induction to prove the statement All horses are the same color. There is no actual contradiction, as these arguments have a crucial flaw that makes them incorrect. This example was originally raised by George Pólya in a 1954 book in different terms: "Are any  numbers equal?" or "Any  girls have eyes of the same color", as an exercise in mathematical induction. It has also been restated as "All cows have the same color".

The "horses" version of the paradox was presented in 1961 in a satirical article by Joel E. Cohen. It was stated as a lemma, which in particular allowed the author to "prove" that Alexander the Great did not exist, and he had an infinite number of limbs.

The argument 

The argument is proof by induction. First, we establish a base case for one horse. We then prove that if  horses have the same color, then  horses must also have the same color.

Base case: One horse
The case with just one horse is trivial. If there is only one horse in the "group", then clearly all horses in that group have the same color.

Inductive step
Assume that  horses always are the same color. Consider a group consisting of  horses.

First, exclude one horse and look only at the other  horses; all these are the same color, since  horses always are the same color. Likewise, exclude some other horse (not identical to the one first removed) and look only at the other  horses. By the same reasoning, these, too, must also be of the same color. Therefore, the first horse that was excluded is of the same color as the non-excluded horses, who in turn are of the same color as the other excluded horse. Hence, the first horse excluded, the non-excluded horses, and the last horse excluded are all of the same color, and we have proven that:
If  horses have the same color, then  horses will also have the same color.

Thus, in any group of horses, all horses must be the same color.

Explanation
The argument above makes the implicit assumption that the set of   horses has the size at least 3, so that the two proper subsets of horses to which the induction assumption is applied would necessarily share a common element. This is not true at the first step of induction, i.e., when .

Let the two horses be horse A and horse B. When horse A is removed, it is true that the remaining horses in the set are the same color (only horse B remains). The same is true when horse B is removed. However, the statement "the first horse in the group is of the same color as the horses in the middle" is meaningless, because there are no "horses in the middle" (common elements (horses) in the two sets). Therefore, the above proof has a logical link broken. The proof forms a falsidical paradox; it seems to show by valid reasoning something that is manifestly false, but in fact the reasoning is flawed.

See also 
Unexpected hanging paradox
List of paradoxes

References

Mathematical paradoxes
Horses in popular culture
Color
Mathematical humor